The Texas Longhorns swimming and diving program represents The University of Texas at Austin in NCAA Division I intercollegiate men's and women's swimming and diving competition. The Longhorns currently compete in the Big 12 Conference.

The first swim team at the University of Texas was created and developed under Tex Robertson. Robertson was the head coach of the team between 1936 and 1943 and between 1946 and 1950. During that period he led the Longhorns to 13 Southwest Conference championships.

In 1979, Eddie Reese became the head coach of the men's swimming team. Under Reese, the Texas men's team has won 15 NCAA championships, the most among all programs, and 41 consecutive conference championships. The women's team has won seven NCAA championships and two AIAW championships.

Men's swimming and diving

NCAA team championships 
1981 – coach: Eddie Reese and Mike Brown (Diving)
1988 – coach: Eddie Reese and Mike Brown (Diving)
1989 – coach: Eddie Reese and Mike Brown (Diving)
1990 – coach: Eddie Reese and Mike Brown (Diving)
1991 – coach: Eddie Reese and Mike Brown (Diving)
1996 – coach: Eddie Reese and Matt Scoggin (Diving)
2000 – coach: Eddie Reese and Matt Scoggin
2001 – coach: Eddie Reese and Matt Scoggin
2002 – coach: Eddie Reese and Matt Scoggin
2010 – coach: Eddie Reese and Matt Scoggin
2015 – coach: Eddie Reese and Matt Scoggin
2016 – coach: Eddie Reese and Matt Scoggin
2017 – coach: Eddie Reese and Matt Scoggin
2018 – coach: Eddie Reese and Matt Scoggin
2021 – coach: Eddie Reese and Matt Scoggin

Individual champions

Relay champions

Records

Conference championships

Southwest Conference 
1932, 1933, 1934, 1935, 1936, 1937, 1938, 1939, 1940, 1941, 1942, 1943, 1944, 1946, 1947, 1948, 1949, 1950, 1951, 1952, 1955, 1980, 1981, 1982, 1983, 1984, 1985, 1986, 1987, 1988, 1989, 1990, 1991, 1992, 1993, 1994, 1995, 1996

Big 12 Conference 
1997, 1998, 1999, 2000, 2001, 2002, 2003, 2004, 2005, 2006, 2007, 2008, 2009, 2010, 2011, 2012, 2013, 2014, 2015, 2016, 2017, 2018, 2019, 2020, 2021, 2022

Women's swimming and diving 
Current head coach Carol Capitani is the 10th head coach in the program's history and has been in charge since June 2012. Matt Scoggin also coaches the women divers.

AIAW team championships 
1981 – coach: Paul Bergen
1982 – coach: Richard Quick

NCAA team championships 
1984 – coach: Richard Quick
1985 – coach: Richard Quick
1986 – coach: Richard Quick
1987 – coach: Richard Quick
1988 – coach: Richard Quick
1990 – coach: Mark Schubert
1991 – coach: Mark Schubert

Conference championships

Southwest Conference 
1983, 1984, 1985, 1986, 1987, 1988, 1989, 1990, 1991, 1992, 1993, 1994, 1995, 1996

Big 12 Conference 
1999, 2000, 2001, 2002, 2003, 2004, 2005, 2006, 2007, 2009, 2011, 2013, 2014, 2015, 2016, 2017, 2018, 2019, 2020, 2021, 2022

Notes and references

External links 
Texas Sports
Men's swimming media guide 2009–10